St. Martin is an unincorporated community and former village in Brown County, Ohio, United States. The community is served by the Fayetteville (45118) post office. The population was 129 at the 2010 census. In November 2011, voters chose to unincorporate St. Martin, and it now falls solely under the jurisdiction of Perry Township.

Gallery

Geography
St. Martin is located at  (39.214219, -83.891475).

Demographics

2010 census
As of the census of 2010, there were 129 people, 47 households, and 36 families living in the village. The racial makeup of the village was 99.2% White and 0.8% from two or more races.

There were 47 households, out of which 29.8% had children under the age of 18 living with them, 72.3% were married couples living together, 2.1% had a female householder with no husband present, 2.1% had a male householder with no wife present, and 23.4% were non-families. 14.9% of all households were made up of individuals, and 10.7% had someone living alone who was 65 years of age or older. The average household size was 2.66 and the average family size was 2.97.

The median age in the village was 49.2 years. 19.4% of residents were under the age of 18; 6.2% were between the ages of 18 and 24; 16.3% were from 25 to 44; 42.7% were from 45 to 64; and 15.5% were 65 years of age or older. The gender makeup of the village was 48.8% male and 51.2% female.

2000 census
As of the census of 2000, there were 91 people, 32 households, and 28 families living in the village. The population density was 78.3 people per square mile (30.3/km). There were 34 housing units at an average density of 29.3 per square mile (11.3/km). The racial makeup of the village was 100.00% White. Hispanic or Latino of any race were 1.10% of the population.

There were 32 households, out of which 40.6% had children under the age of 18 living with them, 81.3% were married couples living together, 6.3% had a female householder with no husband present, and 12.5% were non-families. 12.5% of all households were made up of individuals, and 6.3% had someone living alone who was 65 years of age or older. The average household size was 2.84 and the average family size was 3.11.

In the village the population was spread out, with 28.6% under the age of 18, 6.6% from 18 to 24, 26.4% from 25 to 44, 30.8% from 45 to 64, and 7.7% who were 65 years of age or older. The median age was 40 years. For every 100 females, there were 102.2 males. For every 100 females age 18 and over, there were 103.1 males.

The median income for a household in the village was $60,417, and the median income for a family was $60,833. Males had a median income of $33,750 versus $28,125 for females. The per capita income for the village was $18,833. None of the population and none of the families were below the poverty line.

See also
Chatfield College

References

Unincorporated communities in Brown County, Ohio
Former municipalities in Ohio
2011 disestablishments in Ohio
Populated places disestablished in 2011
Unincorporated communities in Ohio